The Human Dignity Alliance is a minor right-wing political party in Ireland. The party was officially founded on 29 June 2018 by Senator Rónán Mullen.

Background
Mullen, the party's founder, has served as an independent senator for the National University of Ireland constituency since 2007. In 2014 he contested the European Parliament election unsuccessfully in the Midlands-North-West constituency. Mullen was prominent in campaigns opposing same-sex marriage in the 2015 referendum and abortion in the 2018 referendum. He is also a member of the European Christian Political Movement.

Foundation 
The Human Dignity Alliance was borne out of a political grouping within Leinster House that met annually. Following Mullen's campaigns in the 2015 and 2018 referendums, the Human Dignity Alliance was officially established in June 2018 in support of his pro-life position. The party was registered, with the clerk of Dáil Éireann, to contest European and Oireachtas elections. Mullen predicted the party would be a "slow burner" and see growth over time. Independent TD Mattie McGrath in 2018 ruled out joining the Human Dignity Alliance.

References

2018 establishments in Ireland
Anti-abortion organisations in the Republic of Ireland
Christian political parties
Conservative parties in Ireland
Political parties established in 2018
Political parties in the Republic of Ireland
European Christian Political Movement